The fiscal theory of the price level is the idea that government fiscal policy, including debt and taxes present and future, is the primary determinant of the price level or inflation as opposed to monetary theory. FTPL requires confidence the government will not default on its debts, but rather 'inflate away' debts.   FTPL suggests that currency is like a stock in a government and if the government has structural deficit then the 'stock' loses value.

Statement

In nominal terms, government must pay off its existing domestic liabilities (government debt denominated in local currency units) either by refinancing (rolling over the debt, issuing new debt to pay the old) or amortizing (paying it off from surpluses in tax revenue). In real terms, a government can also inflate away the debt: if it causes or allows high inflation, the real amount it must repay will be smaller. Alternatively, it could default on its obligations.

The fiscal theory states that if a government has an unsustainable fiscal policy, such that it will not be able to pay off its obligation in future out of tax revenue (it runs a persistent structural deficit), then it will pay them off via inflating the debt away. Thus, fiscal discipline, meaning a balanced budget over the course of the economic cycle is necessary for the price level to remain stable; unsustainable deficits will require inflation in future. For the price level to be stable (to control inflation), government finances must be sustainable: they must run a balanced budget over the course of the business cycle, meaning they must not run a structural deficit.

Rubinomics suggests that balancing the budget reduces inflation and affects the price level. As such some see it as a form of fiscal theory of the price level.

History

The fiscal theory of the price level was developed primarily by Eric M. Leeper (1991), Christopher A. Sims (1994), and Michael Dean Woodford (1994, 1995, 2001). It has been criticized by Narayana Kocherlakota and Christopher Phelan, Willem Buiter (2002), Bennett T. McCallum (1999, 2001, 2003), Oscar Arce, and Dirk Niepelt. Further work has been done by John H. Cochrane.

See also

 Modern Monetary Theory
 Fiscal discipline

References

Citations

Sources 

 Leonardo Auernheimer, "Monetary Policy Rules, the Fiscal Theory of the Price Level, and (Almost) All that Jazz," in Money, Crises, and Transition: Essays in Honor of Guillermo A. Calvo. Edited by Carmen M. Reinhart, Carlos A. Végh and Andrés Velasco, Cambridge, MA: MIT Press, 2008, pp. 41–67.

Monetary economics
Theory of taxation
Fiscal policy
Government budgets
Business cycle theories